PAS Acheron Kanallaki Football Club is a Greek football club based in Kanallaki, Preveza.

The club was founded in 1971. They promoted to Gamma Ethniki for the first time in 1994-95.

Current squad

Association football clubs established in 1971
1971 establishments in Greece
Football clubs in Epirus
Gamma Ethniki clubs